The 2018–19 season was Everton's 65th consecutive season in the top flight of English football and their 141st year in existence. They participated in the Premier League, FA Cup and EFL Cup.

The season covers the period from 1 July 2018 to 30 June 2019.

Kits

Transfers

Transfers in

Loans in

Transfers out

Loans out

Pre-season

Friendlies
For their pre-season tour, Everton announced they would be playing six teams away from home, which were ATV Irdning, Bury, Lille, Porto, Blackburn Rovers and Rennes. They also played one game at home against Valencia. Everton hosted Gor Mahia at Goodison Park.

Competitions

Premier League

League table

Everton gets 8th.

Results summary

Results by matchday

Matches
On 14 June 2018, the Premier League fixtures for the forthcoming season were announced.

FA Cup
In the FA Cup, Everton entered the competition in the third round and were drawn home to Lincoln City. The fourth round draw was made live on BBC by Robbie Keane and Carl Ikeme from Wolverhampton on 7 January 2019.

EFL Cup
Everton joined the competition in the second round where they defeated Rotherham United at home. They lost to fellow Premier League side Southampton in the third round.

Players

First team squad

Squad statistics

Appearances and goals

|-
! colspan=14 style=background:#dcdcdc; text-align:center| Goalkeepers

|-
! colspan=14 style=background:#dcdcdc; text-align:center| Defenders

|-
! colspan=14 style=background:#dcdcdc; text-align:center| Midfielders

|-
! colspan=14 style=background:#dcdcdc; text-align:center| Forwards

|-
! colspan=14 style=background:#dcdcdc; text-align:center| Players transferred/loaned out during the season

Goalscorers

{| class="wikitable" style="text-align:center;"
|-
!width:35px;"|
!width:35px;"|
!width:35px;"|
!width:200px;"|Player
!width:75px;"|Premier League
!width:75px;"|FA Cup
!width:75px;"|League Cup
!width:75px;"|Total
|-
|rowspan=2| 1 || MF || 18 || align=left|  || 13 || 0 || 1 || 14
|-
| FW || 30 || align=left|  || 13 || 1 || 0 || 14
|-
| 3 || FW || 29 || align=left|  || 6 || 0 || 2 || 8
|-
| 4 || FW || 11 || align=left|  || 5 || 0 || 1 || 6
|-
|rowspan=2| 5 || DF || 12 || align=left|  || 4 || 0 || 0 || 4
|-
| FW || 14 || align=left|  || 3 || 1 || 0 || 4
|-
|rowspan=3| 7 || DF || 5 || align=left|  || 2 || 0 || 0 || 2
|-
| DF || 23 || align=left|  || 2 || 0 || 0 || 2
|-
| MF || 20 || align=left|  || 1 || 1 || 0 || 2
|-
|rowspan=5| 10 || DF || 4 || align=left|  || 1 || 0 || 0 || 1
|-
| DF || 6 || align=left|  || 1 || 0 || 0 || 1
|-
| DF || 13 || align=left|  || 1 || 0 || 0 || 1
|-
| MF || 8 || align=left|  || 1 || 0 || 0 || 1
|-
| FW || 31 || align=left|  || 0 || 1 || 0 || 1
|-
!colspan="4"|Total || 53 || 4 || 4 || 61
|-

Disciplinary record

{|class="wikitable" style="text-align: center;"
|-
!rowspan="2" style="width:50px;"|Rank
!rowspan="2" style="width:50px;"|Position
!rowspan="2" style="width:180px;"|Name
!colspan="2"|Premier League
!colspan="2"|FA Cup
!colspan="2"|League Cup
!colspan="2"|Total
|-
!style="width:30px;"|
!style="width:30px;"|
!style="width:30px;"|
!style="width:30px;"|
!style="width:30px;"|
!style="width:30px;"|
!style="width:30px;"|
!style="width:30px;"|
|-
| rowspan=3|1
|DF
|align=left| Lucas Digne

|5
|1

|0
|0

|1
|0

!6
!1
|-
|MF
|align=left| André Gomes

|7
|0

|0
|0

|0
|0

!7
!0
|-
|MF
|align=left| Idrissa Gueye

|6
|0

|1
|0

|0
|0

!7
!0
|-
|4
|FW
|align=left| Richarlison

|5
|1

|0
|0

|0
|0

!5
!1
|-
| rowspan=2|5
|DF
|align=left| Kurt Zouma

|4
|1

|0
|0

|0
|0

!4
!1
|-
|MF
|align=left| Bernard

|5
|0

|0
|0

|0
|0

!5
!0
|-
|7
|FW
|align=left| Cenk Tosun

|3
|0

|1
|0

|0
|0

!4
!0
|-
| rowspan=5|8
|DF
|align=left| Yerry Mina

|3
|0

|0
|0

|0
|0

!3
!0
|-
|MF
|align=left| Gylfi Sigurðsson

|3
|0

|0
|0

|0
|0

!3
!0
|-
|MF
|align=left| Morgan Schneiderlin

|2
|0

|0
|0

|1
|0

!3
!0
|-
|MF
|align=left| Tom Davies

|3
|0

|0
|0

|0
|0

!3
!0
|-
|FW
|align=left| Dominic Calvert-Lewin

|3
|0

|0
|0

|0
|0

!3
!0
|-
| rowspan=2|13
|DF
|align=left| Michael Keane

|2
|0

|0
|0

|0
|0

!2
!0
|-
|DF
|align=left| Jonjoe Kenny

|1
|0

|1
|0

|0
|0

!2
!0
|-
| rowspan=5|15
|DF
|align=left| Phil Jagielka

|0
|1

|0
|0

|0
|0

!0
!1
|-
|GK
|align=left| Jordan Pickford

|1
|0

|0
|0

|0
|0

!1
!0
|-
|DF
|align=left| Mason Holgate

|1
|0

|0
|0

|0
|0

!1
!0
|-
|DF
|align=left| Séamus Coleman

|1
|0

|0
|0

|0
|0

!1
!0
|-
|FW
|align=left| Theo Walcott

|1
|0

|0
|0

|0
|0

!1
!0
|-
!colspan=3|Total!!54!!4!!3!!0!!2!!0!!59!!4

References

Everton
Everton F.C. seasons